Miguel Ángel López Jaén and Iván Navarro were the defending champions, but they chose to not participate.
Augustin Gensse and Eric Prodon won in the final 6–1, 7–6(7–3) against Giancarlo Petrazzuolo and Simone Vagnozzi.

Seeds

Draw

Draw

External links
 Main Doubles Draw

2009 Doubles
Tanger,Doubles